Josephine Pryde (born 1967 in Alnwick, Northumberland) is an English artist. In 2010, reviewing a show of Pryde's work which featured "seven colour photographs of extreme close-ups of clothing on a body, and four sculptures made from half-finished woven baskets and metal butcher’s hooks," the reviewer Dan Fox said that the work "seemed somewhat aloof," adding his opinion that "there was a healthy cynicism here perhaps worth listening to." On 27 May 2011, an exhibition of Pryde's photographs – titled Embryos and Estate Agents: L'Art de Vivre – went on display at the Chisenhale Gallery in East London.

In 2016 she was one of the four artists short-listed for the Turner Prize.

Pryde's work is held by Reena Spaulings Fine Art and the Museum of Metropolitan Art.

References

Living people
1967 births
People from Alnwick
English artists
British women artists